Norgren is a surname. Notable people with the surname include:

Britta Norgren (born 1983), Swedish cross country skier
Christoffer Norgren (born 1974), Swedish ice hockey player 
Klas Norgren, Swedish sprint canoeist
Nelson Norgren (1891–1974), American football and basketball player and coach.
Pontus Norgren, Swedish guitarist